International Universities Press, Inc. was a private publishing company of academic journals and books on psychotherapy and contiguous disciplines. It was established in 1944 and was based in Madison, CT. It published the following journals:
Psychoanalysis and Contemporary Thought
Journal of Clinical Psychoanalysis
Modern Psychoanalysis
Psychoanalysis and Psychotherapy
Gender & Psychoanalysis
Journal of Imago Relationship Therapy
GROUP

The company ceased operations in 2003.

See also 
List of English-language book publishing companies

References

External links 
 

Academic publishing companies
Publishing companies established in 1944
1944 establishments in Connecticut
2003 disestablishments in Connecticut